B. G. Govindappa is an Indian politician from the state of Karnataka. He is a leader of the Indian National Congress. He was elected Thrice as an MLA from Hosadurga assembly constituency.

Political career 
He won three times as an MLA in 1999, 2004 and in 2013. But in 2018 elections he was defeated by Gulhatty D. Shekhar of Bharatiya Janata Party.

References 

Indian National Congress politicians
People from Karnataka
People from Bangalore
1955 births
Living people
People from Chitradurga district